All's Well That Ends Well is a play by William Shakespeare, published in the First Folio in 1623, where it is listed among the comedies. There is a debate regarding the dating of the composition of the play, with possible dates ranging from 1598 to 1608.

Bertram is compelled to marry Helena. Bertram refuses to consummate their marriage. He goes to Italy. In Italy he courts Diana. Helena meets Diana. They perform the bed trick.

The play is considered one of Shakespeare's "problem plays", a play that poses complex ethical dilemmas that require more than typically simple solutions.

Characters

 King of France
 Duke of Florence
 Bertram, Count of Roussillon
 Countess of Roussillon, Mother of Bertram
 Lavatch, a Clown in her household
 Helena, a Gentlewoman protected by the Countess
 Lafew, an old Lord
 Parolles, a follower of Bertram
 An Old Widow of Florence, surnamed Capilet
 Diana, Daughter of the Widow
 Steward of the Countess of Roussillon
 Violenta (ghost character) and Mariana, Neighbours and Friends of the Widow
 A Page
 Soldiers, Servants, Gentlemen, and Courtiers

Synopsis

Helena, the low-born ward of a French-Spanish countess, is in love with the countess's son Bertram, who is indifferent to her. Bertram goes to Paris to replace his late father as attendant to the ailing King of France. Helena, the daughter of a recently deceased physician, follows Bertram, ostensibly to offer the King her services as a healer. The King is skeptical, and she guarantees the cure with her life: if he dies, she will be put to death, but if he lives, she may choose a husband from the court.

The King is cured and Helena chooses Bertram, who rejects her, owing to her poverty and low status. The King forces him to marry her, but after the ceremony Bertram immediately goes to war in Italy without so much as a goodbye kiss. He says that he will only marry her after she has carried his child and wears his family ring. Helena returns home to the countess, who is horrified at what her son has done, and claims Helena as her child in Bertram's place.

In Italy, Bertram is a successful warrior and also a successful seducer of local virgins. Helena follows him to Italy, befriends Diana, a virgin with whom Bertram is infatuated, and they arrange for Helena to take Diana's place in bed. Diana obtains Bertram's ring in exchange for one of Helena's. In this way Helena, without Bertram's knowledge, consummates their marriage and wears his ring.

Helena fakes her own death. Bertram, thinking he is free of her, comes home. He tries to marry a local lord's daughter, but Diana shows up and breaks up the engagement. Helena appears and explains the ring swap, announcing that she has fulfilled Bertram's challenge; Bertram, impressed by all she has done to win him, swears his love to her. Thus all ends well.

There is a subplot about Parolles, a disloyal associate of Bertram's: Some of the lords at the court attempt to get Bertram to know that his friend Parolles is a boasting coward, as Lafew and the Countess have also said. They convince Parolles to cross into enemy territory to fetch a drum that he left behind. While on his way, they pose as enemy soldiers, kidnap him, blindfold him, and, with Bertram observing, get him to betray his friends, and besmirch Bertram's character.

Sources

The play is based on the tale of Giletta di Narbona (tale nine of day three) of Boccaccio's The Decameron. F. E. Halliday speculated that Shakespeare may have read a French translation of the tale in William Painter's Palace of Pleasure.

Analysis and criticism

There is no evidence that All's Well That Ends Well was popular in Shakespeare's own lifetime and it has remained one of his lesser-known plays ever since, in part due to its unorthodox mixture of fairy tale logic, gender role reversals and cynical realism. Helena's love for the seemingly unlovable Bertram is difficult to explain on the page, but in performance, it can be made acceptable by casting an extremely attractive actor and emphasising the possibility of a homosexual relationship between Bertram and the "clothes horse" fop, Parolles: "A filthy officer he is in those suggestions for the
young earl." (Act III Sc5.)  This latter interpretation also assists at the point in the final scene in which Bertram suddenly switches from hatred to love in just one line. This is considered a particular problem for actors trained to admire psychological realism. However, some alternative readings emphasise the "if" in his equivocal promise: "If she, my liege, can make me know this clearly, I'll love her dearly, ever, ever dearly." Here, there has been no change of heart at all. Productions like London's National Theatre in 2009 have Bertram make his promise seemingly normally, but then end the play hand-in-hand with Helena, staring out at the audience with a look of "aghast bewilderment" suggesting he only relented to save face in front of the King. A 2018 interpretation from director Caroline Byrne at the Sam Wanamaker Playhouse, London, effects Bertram's reconciliation with Helena by having him make good his vow (Act 2 Scene 2) of only taking her as his wife when she bears his child; as well as Bertram's ring, Helena brings their infant child to their final confrontation before the king.

Many critics consider that the truncated ending is a drawback, with Bertram's conversion so sudden. Speculative explanations have been given for this. There is (as always) possibly missing text. Some suggest that Bertram's conversion is meant to be sudden and magical in keeping with the 'clever wench performing tasks to win an unwilling higher born husband' theme of the play. Some consider that Bertram is not meant to be contemptible, merely a callow youth learning valuable lessons about values. Contemporary audiences would readily have recognised Bertram's enforced marriage as a metaphor for the new requirement (1606), directed at followers of the Catholic religion, to swear an Oath of Allegiance to Protestant King James, suggests academic Andrew Hadfield of the University of Sussex.

Many directors have taken the view that when Shakespeare wrote a comedy, he did intend there to be a happy ending, and accordingly that is the way the concluding scene should be staged. Elijah Moshinsky in his BBC Television Shakespeare version in 1981 had his Bertram (Ian Charleson) give Helena a tender kiss and speak wonderingly. Despite his outrageous actions, Bertram can come across as beguiling; the 1967 RSC performance with Ian Richardson as Bertram by various accounts (The New Cambridge Shakespeare, 2003 etc.) managed to make Bertram sympathetic, even charming. Ian Charleson's Bertram was cold and egotistical but still attractive.

One character that has been admired is that of the old Countess of Roussillon, which Shaw thought "the most beautiful old woman's part ever written". Modern productions are often promoted as vehicles for great mature actresses; examples in recent decades have starred Judi Dench and Peggy Ashcroft, who delivered a performance of "entranc[ing]...worldly wisdom and compassion" in Trevor Nunn's sympathetic, "Chekhovian" staging at Stratford in 1982. In the BBC Television Shakespeare production she was played by Celia Johnson, dressed and posed as Rembrandt's portrait of Margaretha de Geer.

It has recently been argued that Thomas Middleton either collaborated with Shakespeare on the play, or revised it at a later time. The proposed revisions are not universally accepted however.

Performance history

No records of the early performances of All's Well That Ends Well have been found. In 1741, the work was played at Goodman's Fields, with a later transfer to Drury Lane. Rehearsals at Drury Lane started in October 1741 but William Milward (1702–1742), playing the king, was taken ill, and the opening was delayed until the following 22 January. Peg Woffington, playing Helena, fainted on the first night and her part was read. Milward was taken ill again on 2 February and died on 6 February. This, together with unsubstantiated tales of more illnesses befalling other actresses during the run, gave the play an "unlucky" reputation, similar to that attached to Macbeth, and this may have curtailed the number of subsequent revivals.

Henry Woodward (1714–1777) popularised the part of Parolles in the era of David Garrick. Sporadic performances followed in the ensuing decades, with an operatic version at Covent Garden in 1832.

The play, with plot elements drawn from romance and the ribald tale, depends on gender role conventions, both as expressed (Bertram) and challenged (Helena). With evolving conventions of gender roles, Victorian objections centred on the character of Helena, who was variously deemed predatory, immodest and both "really despicable" and a "doormat" by Ellen Terry, who also—and rather contradictorily—accused her of "hunt[ing] men down in the most undignified way". Terry's friend George Bernard Shaw greatly admired Helena's character, comparing her with the New Woman figures such as Nora in Henrik Ibsen's A Doll's House. The editor of the Arden Shakespeare volume summed up 19th century repugnance: "everyone who reads this play is at first shocked and perplexed by the revolting idea that underlies the plot."

In 1896, Frederick S. Boas coined the term "problem play" to include the unpopular work, grouping it with Hamlet, Troilus and Cressida and Measure for Measure.

References

Bibliography
 Evans, G. Blakemore, The Riverside Shakespeare, 1974.
 
 Lawrence, W. W., Shakespeare's Problem Comedies, 1931.
 Price, Joseph G., The Unfortunate Comedy, 1968.
 Schoff, Francis G., "Claudio, Bertram, and a Note on Interpretation", Shakespeare Quarterly, 1959.
 Styan, J. G., Shakespeare in Performance series: All's Well That Ends Well, 1985.

External links
 
 
 Folger Shakespeare Library: All's Well That Ends Well
 MaximumEdge.com Shakespeare: All's Well That Ends Well – searchable scene-indexed version of the play.
 

1600s plays
Plays based on works by Giovanni Boccaccio
English proverbs
English Renaissance plays
British plays adapted into films
Plays by Thomas Middleton
Plays set in France
Shakespearean comedies